The Peugeot 4002 was a bespoke show car created purely as a stylistic exercise at the behest of Peugeot in 2003.

Design competition
Peugeot introduced a web-based amateur style competition at the 2002 Paris Motor Show, inviting aspiring designers to create a completely unhinged retro-futurist design that incorporated distinct styling features of a historic Peugeot model.  A total of 2800 proposals from 90 countries were registered, and Stefan Schulze, a 32-year-old German graphic artist, was selected as the winner.  At the 2003 Geneva Motor Show, Schulze was awarded a trophy (La griffe) and €5000, and it was announced that Peugeot would create a full-scale version of the design.

Creation

The completed design was shown at the 2003 Frankfurt Motor Show.  It featured a body of aluminum and fiberglass, and 21-inch wheels.  The 4002 incorporated headlights hidden behind the grille itself, as a stylistic nod to the streamlined Peugeot 402 from 1936.  As merely a show car, it was not powered and not road-legal.  As a styling experiment, the car was considered dynamic, glamorous, and supremely daring, but probably too extreme to predict any real influence on future Peugeot designs.

References

4002
2000s cars
4002